El Caballo Blanco (Spanish for The White Horse) was the name for an equine Andalusian theme park that operated in the north-eastern Perth suburb of  in Western Australia from 1974.

The first Spanish horses arrived in Australia in 1972 and were brought to the El Caballo complex at Wooroloo, by the Western Australian business entrepreneur, Ray Williams. Williams imported the well known stallion Bodeguero and a number of mares, as the foundation of the 'Bodeguero Stud'. Many of the present day Andalusian horses in Australia trace back to Bodeguero and those first mares. El Caballo Resort was established in 1974 at Wooroloo and their dancing horses were a popular tourist attraction.

Williams, who was married to Audrey C Lockyer, met Edith Evans, an El Paso Texan born but Durango Mexico pioneer, female Rejoneador (horseback bullfighter) and actress in 'el caballo torero' movie whilst forming the registry of Andalusion horses (in approx 1977). In 1978 Williams established the El Caballo Blanco theme park at Catherine Fields near the Sydney suburb of Narellan, New South Wales with the wealthy entrepreneur Emmannual Margolin. Its main attraction was its Andalusian dancing stallions sent from the WA stud, but the park also featured miniature Fallabella horses, and a number of non-equestrian related amusements such as water slides, train rides, and a small wildlife zoo.

His relationship with Edith Evans saw him leave Australia seeking bigger things. Williams and Edith Evans then went on to establish an El Caballo Blanco park at The Kingdom of horses in Buena Park in the US. Williams died in 1983 from self inflicted gunshot. A medical alzheimers diagnosis is proposed by some as well as relationship issues over financial stress.
 
After Williams' death in the US, Edith claimed bankruptcy on the U.S Kingdom of Dancing Stallions, and the operations of the various El Caballo Blanco theme parks in Australia gradually wound down and ceased. After quite some years, the Wooroloo complex in Western Australia once again hosting the famed Spanish dancing horse show. The Wooroloo site was sold in May 2020 to the Aboriginal Housing Foundation for redevelopment.

References

External links
 Article referencing the park, even though by 2005 when the article was published, El Caballo Blanco had been closed for some time.
 Brief biography of Manolo Mendez, who directed the shows at El Caballo Blanco.
 Article by the Andalusian Horse Association of Australia on the Perth operation

Wooroloo, Western Australia
Horse circuses and entertainment
Defunct amusement parks in Australia
1974 establishments in Australia
1995 disestablishments in Australia